This is an annotated list of biological websites, including only notable websites dealing with biology generally and those with a more specific focus.

See also
List of biodiversity databases
Lists of websites

 
Websites
Lists of websites